Tom Sheahan (born 5 September 1968) is an Irish Fine Gael politician who served as a Senator for the Administrative Panel from 2011 to 2016 and a Teachta Dála (TD) for the Kerry South constituency from 2007 to 2011. 

He was elected to the 30th Dáil at the 2007 general election. He was elected to Kerry County Council for the Killarney local electoral area following the 2004 local elections.

He was the Fine Gael Deputy Spokesperson on Agriculture, with special responsibility for Forestry from October 2010 to March 2011. Previously, he served as Deputy Spokesperson on Agriculture, with special responsibility for Fisheries from 2007 to 2010.

He is a member of the Kerry Mental Health Association, Rathmore Community Council and Rathmore GAA Club.

He lost his seat at the 2011 general election to party colleague Brendan Griffin. He was subsequently elected to Seanad Éireann as a Senator for the Administrative Panel in April 2011. He was the Fine Gael Seanad Spokesperson on Public Expenditure and Reform.

In September 2012, he made remarks in the Seanad in which he referred to the accidental death of a Garda and claimed a Sinn Féin member had allegedly said "they would have done a much cleaner job". His comments were criticised by the Garda Representatives Association, and by the Sinn Féin Kerry North TD Martin Ferris, who challenged Sheahan to name the person.

In 2014, Sheahan made "anti-Traveller" comments which sparked a controversy in County Kerry. He later denied the misinterpretation of his comment and clarified his stance on the matter of  Irish Travellers and Roma communities.

He was an unsuccessful candidate at the 2020 Seanad election.

References

 

1968 births
Living people
Fine Gael TDs
Members of the 24th Seanad
Members of the 30th Dáil
Politicians from County Kerry
Fine Gael senators